Dolichopus is a large cosmopolitan genus of flies in the family Dolichopodidae. Adults are small flies, typically less than 8 mm in length. Nearly all species are metallic greenish-blue to greenish-bronze. It is the largest genus of Dolichopodidae with more than 600 species worldwide.

The name of the genus (δολιχός, long, and ποὺς, foot) refers to the length of the feet of its species.

Gallery

Species groups and subgenera
The following species groups exist in Dolichopus:
 Dolichopus latipennis species group (= Hygroceleuthus Loew, 1857)
 Dolichopus lonchophorus species group
 Dolichopus longisetus species group
 Dolichopus planitarsis species group (8 species) – Palaearctic
 Dolichopus plumipes species group (11 species) – Palaearctic
 Dolichopus sagittarius species group
 Dolichopus salictorum species group
 Dolichopus signifer species group
 Dolichopus sublimbatus species group (4 species)
 Dolichopus tewoensis species group (3 species) – China

Sometimes the following are considered subgenera of Dolichopus:
 Dolichopus Latreille, 1796
 Hygroceleuthus Loew, 1857 (= Dolichopus latipennis species group)
 Macrodolichopus Stackelberg, 1933

See also
 List of Dolichopus species

References

 
Dolichopodidae genera
Dolichopodinae
Articles containing video clips
Taxa named by Pierre André Latreille